Metachela is a genus of flies in the family Empididae.

Species
M. convexa MacDonald, 1989
M. albipes (Walker, 1849)
M. collusor (Melander, 1902)
M. nigriventris (Loew, 1864)

References

Empidoidea genera
Empididae